Domna Maria Michailidou (born 13 November 1987) is a Greek academic who is serving as Deputy Minister of Labour and Social Affairs. She is responsible for social welfare and social solidarity.

Biography  

Michailidou is an academic economist working on economic development, financial crises and public finances. She was previously Reforms’ Adviser to the leader of the New Democracy Party in Greece, where she advised Kyriakos Mitsotakis on issues related to structural reforms, macroeconomic growth and financial markets. 

Since 2014, Michailidou has also been a lecturer in the Centre of Development Studies, University of Cambridge where she teaches topics related to finance and development, private and public debt and government regulation. She has worked for the OECD in Paris and Athens as an economist and a competition expert. Michailidou has also taught at the Judge Business School, University of Cambridge and University College London’s School of Public Policy. She has advised governmental and non-governmental institutions such as the UNDP, the FAO, the British Council, the Ministry of Health in Iran and others. 

Her book, The Inexorable Evolution of Financialisation: Financial Crises in Emerging Markets, was published by Palgrave MacMillan in 2016. Her work has also appeared in academic journals, institutional reports and the popular press. She holds an MPhil and a PhD in Financial and Development Economics from the University of Cambridge.

Manuscript 

 Michailidou D.M. 'Financial Crises in Emerging Markets: The destabilising effects of sudden surges of capital inflows and the inexorable evolution of financialisation', Palgrave Macmillan, published in November 2015. Foreword by G. Harcourt.

Academic journals 

 Kennedy J. and D.M. Michailidou, 2017, 'Divergent Policy Responses to Increasing Vaccine Skepticism in Southern Europe', The Lancet Infectious Diseases.

 Kennedy J. and D.M. Michailidou, 2017, 'Civil war, contested sovereignty and the limits of global health partnerships: A case study of the Syrian polio outbreak in 2013', Health Policy and Planning, Oxford University Press.

 Bowden S., Michailidou D.M. and Pereira A., 2008, 'Chasing Mosquitoes: An exploration of the relationship between economic growth, poverty and the elimination of malaria in Southern Europe in the 20th Century' published in the Journal of International Development (Vol. 20, issue 8).

Popular press 

 Domna Michailidou and Jonathan Kennedy (2017). 'When Populism can Kill,' Project Syndicate

 Jonathan Kennedy and Domna Michailidou (2016). 'Rethinking Humanitarian Aid in Civil Wars,' Project Syndicate 
Jonathan Kennedy and Domna Michailidou (2016): 'The politics of polio eradication,' Project Syndicate [Translated into 7 languages and republished in a variety of newspapers including: El Pais (Spain), L'Orient le Jour (Lebanon), Gulf Times (Qatar), Al Shabiba (Oman), Al Bayan and Khaleej Times (United Arab Emirates), Arab News (Saudi Arabia), Le Quotidien d'Oran (Algeria), The Reporter (Ethiopia), Mareeg (Somalia), Outlook Afghanistan (Afghanistan), Postimees (Estonia), Financial Mirror (Cyprus), Khmer Times (Cambodia), AZERNEWS (Azerbaijan), Expreso (Ecuador)]

References 

Alumni of the University of Cambridge
Women government ministers of Greece
1987 births
Living people
Greek expatriates in the United Kingdom
21st-century Greek economists
Greek women economists